Langston Avery Hall (born November 1, 1991) is an American professional basketball player for Bahçeşehir Koleji of the Basketbol Süper Ligi (BSL) and Basketball Champions League. He played at the collegiate level with the Mercer Bears, and was named Atlantic Sun Player of the Year in his final year.

High school career
Hall played high school basketball at Chamblee Charter High School, in Atlanta, Georgia.

College career
Hall played college basketball at Mercer College from 2010 to 2014. During his college career, he has been selected as the Atlantic Sun Player of the Year in 2014 and he was awarded with the Lou Henson Award the same year. In 2012, he led Mercer to the CIT Tournament Championship and was named MVP of the Tournament. In 2014, he led Mercer to their first NCAA Tournament in 29 years. Mercer upset Duke for their first NCAA Tournament win in program history. Mercer lost to Tennessee in the following round in his final collegiate game.

Professional career 
After not being selected in the 2014 NBA draft, Hall played with the Miami Heat summer league team in Orlando.

On July 22, 2014, Hall signed with Giorgio Tesi Pistoia of the Lega Basket Serie A. He joined the roster with Fuquan Edwin, who played a key role for Seton Hall, only the second American on the team.

On July 1, 2015, he signed a 1+1 contract with Pallacanestro Cantù. On December 14, 2015, he parted ways with Cantù and signed with Telekom Baskets Bonn for the rest of the season.

On July 24, 2016, Hall joined Kolossos Rodou for the 2016–17 season.

On June 17, 2017, Hall signed with Croatian club Cibona for the 2017–18 season. On October 17, 2017, he parted ways with Cibona and moved to Promitheas Patras of the Greek Basket League. On July 3, 2019, Hall re-signed with Promitheas for another season.

On July 9, 2020, Hall signed with the Serbian powerhouse Crvena zvezda of the ABA League and the EuroLeague. He averaged 4.8 points and 3.4 assists per game.

On July 12, 2021, Hall signed with Bahçeşehir Koleji of the Turkish Basketball Super League (BSL).

References

External links
 Langston Hall at aba-liga.com
 Langston Hall at championsleague.basketball
 
 Langston Hall at esake.gr 
 Langston Hall at eurobasket.com
 Langston Hall at legabasket.it 

1991 births
Living people
ABA League players
American expatriate basketball people in Croatia
American expatriate basketball people in Germany
American expatriate basketball people in Greece
American expatriate basketball people in Italy
American expatriate basketball people in Serbia
American men's basketball players
Bahçeşehir Koleji S.K. players
Basketball League of Serbia players
Basketball players from Atlanta
KK Cibona players
KK Crvena zvezda players
Kolossos Rodou B.C. players
Mercer Bears men's basketball players
Pallacanestro Cantù players
Pistoia Basket 2000 players
Point guards
Promitheas Patras B.C. players
Shooting guards
Telekom Baskets Bonn players